The 1913–14 Columbia men's ice hockey season was the 18th season of play for the program.

Season
After the dissolution of the IHA, Columbia no longer had access to the St. Nicholas Rink as a home arena (though they were still able to practice at the venue). While a few games were tentatively scheduled in December and January, none were played until February. the Lions were forced to play all of their games on the road during the season. While there was a glimmer of hope after the win against Cornell, three successive terrible losses had the team finish with a 1–4 record.

Roster

Standings

Schedule and Results

|-
!colspan=12 style=";" | Regular Season

References

Columbia Lions men's ice hockey seasons
Columbia
Columbia
Columbia
Columbia